Brad is an American rock band that formed in Seattle, Washington in 1992. Their sound was influenced by the wide variety of influences brought by its members, including Stone Gossard of Pearl Jam, Regan Hagar (of Satchel and formerly a member of Malfunkshun), Shawn Smith (a member of Pigeonhed and also of Satchel), and Jeremy Toback.

History
Brad formed officially in 1992, although the band members had been playing together for a long time before that. The band's line-up was composed of vocalist Shawn Smith, guitarist Stone Gossard, bassist Jeremy Toback, and drummer Regan Hagar. The band originally wanted to go by the name Shame; however, the band found that the name was already taken by a band featuring musician Brad Wilson. Instead, the band took the name Brad and decided to name its debut album Shame. Shame, released on April 27, 1993 through Epic Records, was recorded in 17 days, with many tracks taken from in-studio jam sessions. Shame, featuring a raw sound and an eclectic mix of styles, was released to mixed reviews and moderate sales. The track "20th Century" was a minor hit in the UK.

The band's follow-up album, Interiors, released on June 24, 1997, was much more polished. Tom Moon of Rolling Stone said that "what's most notable about Interiors...is the pure pop focus of these nuanced compositions." The lead single from Interiors, "The Day Brings", features Mike McCready from Pearl Jam on lead guitar. Interiors was met with poor sales; however, the band saw its cult audience expand. The album was accompanied by a tour in the United States and Canada that same year, as well as a small tour in Australia and New Zealand in 1998.

A third album, Welcome to Discovery Park, was released on August 13, 2002 through Redline Records. The recording of Welcome to Discovery Park saw contributions from Mike Berg, who had taken over as the touring bassist for Toback. The album mixes the rawness of Shame and the polished, produced sound of Interiors. Bradley Torreano of AllMusic called it "another quality album that still leaves the listener hungry overall for some better songs." In July 2005, the band released an album of unreleased and incomplete Brad and Satchel tracks called Brad vs Satchel through The Establishment Store.

The band's fourth studio album, tentatively titled Best Friends? was recorded in 2003 and was being prepared for release in 2006. In September 2007, the album was still awaiting release as the band reunited for a small series of live performances, starting in October 2007, with Kevin Wood (of Malfunkshun) joining the band as an additional guitarist. Songs from the forthcoming Best Friends? album were played at the 2007 and 2008 performances.

Brad performed live at Seattle's Showbox on April 14, 2010 and news about 'Best Friends?' imminent release was posted on their official website. The album was released on August 10, 2010 through the Pearl Jam website. Brad toured the U.S. with Band of Horses in support of the album.

In 2011 the band announced that they would record and perform on a more permanent basis and signed a new record deal with Razor & Tie. The band spent many months in the recording studio for what would become their fifth record United We Stand. United We Stand was released on April 28, 2012 followed by a short US tour. Later that year their first European tour was announced which started in February 2013.

Smith died at his home in Seattle on April 3, 2019, of a torn aorta and high blood pressure.

Band members
Current
Stone Gossard – guitar (1992–present)
Regan Hagar – drums (1992–present)
Keith Lowe - bass guitar (2008–present)

Former
Jeremy Toback – bass guitar (1992–1997)
Mike Berg – bass guitar (1997–2005)
Shawn Smith – keyboard, vocals (1992–2019; died 2019)

Additional personnel
James Hall – guitar, keyboard (1997)
Matt Brown – guitar, keyboard (1997)
Elizabeth Pupo-Walker – percussion (2001–2002)
Thaddeus Turner – guitars, bass (2001–2002)
Kevin Wood – guitar (2007)
Happy Chichester - guitar, keys, backing vocals (2010–present)

Discography

Studio albums

Compilations

Singles

See also
List of alternative rock artists

References

External links

1992 establishments in Washington (state)
Alternative rock groups from Washington (state)
Epic Records artists
Musical groups established in 1992
Musical groups from Seattle
Musical quintets